Lazer Team 2 is a 2017 American science fiction action comedy film directed, produced and co-written by Matt Hullum and Daniel Fabelo. The film is a sequel to 2015's Lazer Team, and follows the team travelling through a wormhole to find their missing friend Woody. It was released on YouTube Red in November 2017. It received positive reviews, critics stating it as an improvement from its predecessor.

Plot
Four years after the events of the previous film, the D.E.T.I.A. has mostly lost its funding and nearly everyone has been let go. Lazer Team has also been disbanded, as the four heroes do not work well together, Woody (Gavin Free) being the only member to be reassigned. He, along with Dr. Maggie Whittington (Nichole Sakura), has been attempting to create a rift in space, after receiving an unknown transmission. Once the rift is perfected, Woody is taken by an alien being, his helmet remaining behind. After an attempted rescue ends in a failure, Major Evelyn Kilbourne (Victoria Pratt) is now head of the D.E.T.I.A., and declares that any project associated with Lazer Team is to be shut down. This announcement angers Maggie, who is determined to not leave Woody lost forever. When her lab is getting cleaned out, Maggie steals a device called the translocator and sets out to find the remaining members of Lazer Team.

With the team split, Herman (Colton Dunn) has capitalized on his fame in the form of marketing and commercialism; Zach (Michael Jones) owns and operates a 'lazer' hair removal business in an attempt to win back his ex-girlfriend, Mindy (Allie DeBerry); Hagan (Burnie Burns) suffers from depression, as he feels his life has peaked, and he actually wants the team to form again. Maggie is able to gather the three at Hagan's house and explains the situation. While Hagan readily agrees, Herman and Zach are less than excited. The team sneaks into the base, where they're able to temporarily re-open the rift. However, Kilbourne intervenes and fights them. They all make it into the portal before it closes and Kilbourne is knocked unconscious. The four find that they're on an alien spacecraft, somewhere deep in space. Maggie also realizes that because too many people went through the rift, the translocator is out of power.  Not wasting any time, they crawl through vents to avoid detection. Maggie is immediately taken by the creature that abducted Woody, and the rest of the team escape the other way. Upon exiting the vents, the three are captured and imprisoned by cloaked figures. They reveal themselves to be the Antareans. Their leader, Arklosh, still holds a grudge over Lazer Team's previous victory, so the aliens remove the Champion Armor pieces from them and, along with Woody's helmet, they disintegrate it.

The Antareans transfer them to a white prison, that is one of infinite cells containing previous champions from over the years. Before they can panic, Woody arrives and rescues them. Without his helmet, it appears that his intelligence has decreased. He takes them to a compartment in the ship, where Maggie is held. She wakes, but is upset that Woody is not the one she's known. The creature that had abducted the two reveals himself. Woody introduces him as Doulos, the keeper of the 'Galactic Games' and the only remaining of the Ludon species, who has been enslaved on the ship for many years. He explains that when the team defeated the Antareans, it caused said aliens to wipe out planet after planet, afraid that more champions would rise and rebel against them. Revealing that he brought the team back together to finish what they've started, he leads the five to a control center where an experimental upgraded suit of power resides. The team is unwilling and Doulos urges the team to put on the pieces, however he is killed by Kilbourne before he can convince them. She reveals that she is the sister of the previous champion, Adam, and is now working with the Antareans, as she's always been jealous. Once the team is in a holding cell, she prepares to receive the pieces to destroy Earth.

When the ship finally arrives to Earth, the team realize their wrongdoings with not helping Doulos. They kill two guards before sneaking back to the control center. A battle ensues and Lazer Team acquires the upgraded armor. Back on Earth, Officer Vandenbloom (Kirk Johnson) notices many Antarean ships heading for the planet. With the help of Mindy and 'Mr. Scientist' (Gus Sorola), he is able to fend off the majority of the ships using a turret designed by the D.E.T.I.A. Back on the ship, the five are able to kill Kilbourne, with the help of another champion Woody had let out, and grab the translocator. They board a small ship, and using the device, are able to destroy the Antarean mother-ship and return home.

With the Earth saved once again, the team keeps contact with one another. Having a picnic, Woody and Maggie reveal their feelings for each other. They discover a small button on his helmet that shrinks it, and the two kiss.

Cast
 Burnie Burns as Anthony Hagan, a former traffic cop and a member of Lazer Team. Hagan wears the left arm of the suit, allowing him to generate an energy shield.
 Gavin Free as Woodrow "Woody" Johnson, a member of Lazer Team. Woody wears the helmet of the suit, heightening his intelligence and granting him other enhancements such as X-ray vision.
 Michael Jones as Zachary "Zach" Spencer, a former six year High School senior and a member of Lazer Team. Zach wears the right arm of the suit, which is an energy cannon.
 Colton Dunn as Herman Mendoza, a former football athlete (who played on a team with Hagan) and a member of Lazer Team. Herman wears the boots of the suit, which let him run at superhuman speeds.
 Nichole Sakura as Maggie Wittington, a scientist who gets Lazer Team to help her find Woody after he disappears into a wormhole.
 Victoria Pratt as Major Evelyn Kilbourne, who strongly opposes Dr. Whittington's plans.
 Gus Sorola as 'Mr. Scientist' aka the disheveled scientist from the first film.
 Alexandria DeBerry as Mindy Hagan, Anthony Hagan's daughter and Zach's ex-girlfriend.
 Kirk Johnson as Officer Vandenbloom
 Ashley Jenkins as RTN News Anchor
 Joel Heyman as Reporter #1
 Barbara Dunkelman as Reporter #2
 A. Smith Harrison as TV Announcer
 Bryon Brown as Commercial Director
 Jack Lee as Channing Rosegood
 Lawrence Sonntag as Max
 Greg Miller as Ralph
 Matt Hullum as Voice of Arklosh
 Hailley Lauren as Doulos
 Danu Uribe as Receptionist and Voice of Doulos
 Tyler Coe as "Football" Player

Production
On August 5, 2016, Burnie Burns and Gavin Free announced that a sequel to Lazer Team was green-lit by Rooster Teeth in partnership with YouTube Red and they had officially begun pre-production on the film. In December 2016, Matt Hullum confirmed Rooster Teeth was aiming to shoot Lazer Team 2 in late Spring in Texas followed by release in 2017. On August 25, 2017, it was confirmed that the film was written by Burns, Hullum, and Fabelo.

Shooting was completed in only half as many days, 20, as the first film. In April 2017, filming for the sequel concluded. On October 12, 2017, Rooster Teeth released the trailer for the sequel that revealed the film's release date to be November 13, 2017 in theaters and November 22, 2017 on YouTube Red.

References

External links
 

2017 films
2017 independent films
2017 action comedy films
2010s science fiction comedy films
American science fiction comedy films
American independent films
American buddy films
Films set in Texas
Films shot in Austin, Texas
Fullscreen (company)
YouTube Premium films
2017 science fiction action films
2010s English-language films
2010s American films